Royce Gracie (born 12 December 1966) is a Brazilian retired professional mixed martial artist, a UFC Hall of Famer, and a Gracie Jiu-Jitsu practitioner. A member of the Gracie family, he is considered to be one of the most influential figures in the history of mixed martial arts (MMA). He also competed at PRIDE Fighting Championships, K-1's MMA events and at Bellator.

Gracie gained fame for his success in the Ultimate Fighting Championship. Between 1993 and 1994, he was the tournament winner of UFC 1, UFC 2 and UFC 4, which at the time was an openweight single-elimination tournament with minimal rules. He was also known for his rivalry with Ken Shamrock, whom he beat in UFC 1 and then fought to a draw in the Superfight Championship rematch at UFC 5. Royce would later compete in PRIDE Fighting Championships, where he is most remembered for his 90-minute bout against Kazushi Sakuraba in 2000, and a controversial "Judo vs Jiu-Jitsu" mixed rules match against olympic gold-medalist in Judo Hidehiko Yoshida at Pride Shockwave in 2002.

Royce Gracie popularized Gracie Jiu-Jitsu (also known as Brazilian jiu-jitsu) and revolutionized mixed martial arts with his results contributing to the movement towards grappling and ground fighting in the sport. In 2008, Gracie was ranked by Inside MMA as the third-greatest mixed martial arts fighter of all time.

Background 
Royce Gracie was born in Rio de Janeiro, Brazil in 1966. One of the nine sons of jiu-jitsu grandmaster Hélio Gracie, having learned the art from his father since his childhood. He had his first competition at age 8 and started teaching classes when he was 14 years old. When he was 17, Royce was awarded a black belt by his father, Hélio. A few months later he and his brothers Royler and Rickson Gracie moved to Torrance, California to live with his older brother Rorion Gracie, who had moved there in 1978 and had established Gracie Academy.

The Gracie brothers in the United States continued the family's tradition of the "Gracie Challenge", in which they challenged other martial artists to a no-holds-barred Vale Tudo match in their gym in order to prove the superiority of Gracie jiu-jitsu. Rorion would later edit footage from the Gracie Challenge fights into a single documentary series known as Gracie in Action, with some footage featuring Royce's fights.  The Gracie in Action tapes inspired Art Davie to create the UFC.

Mixed martial arts career

Ultimate Fighting Championship (UFC)

UFC 1
The Ultimate Fighting Championship was founded in 1993 by Rorion Gracie, business executive Art Davie, and the Semaphore Entertainment Group (SEG). The premise of the event was doing a eight-man openweight single-elimination tournament, with minimal rules, from fighters representing different martial arts, in order to find the most effective and strongest fighting style. While Davie and the SEG were interested in doing an event with violent and exciting Vale Tudo fights similar to what they had seen on the Gracie in Action tapes, Rorion was interested in promoting his family's own Jiu-Jitsu style by defeating larger and stronger opponents from more well-known martial arts. Rorion said he picked Royce to represent the family's art because of his skinnier and smaller frame, to show how a small person can defeat a bigger opponent using jiu-jitsu.

Gracie entered the tournament wearing his now iconic Brazilian jiu-jitsu gi. In his first match, Gracie defeated journeyman boxer Art Jimmerson. He tackled him to the ground using a baiana (morote-gari or double-leg) and obtained the dominant "mounted" position. Mounted and with only one free arm, Jimmerson conceded defeat.

In the semi-finals, Gracie fought against shootfighter and King of Pancrase Ken Shamrock. This was Royce's most difficult match, as Shamrock had grappling experience (having caught Patrick Smith in a heel hook in a previous match). Gracie started the round by attempting a double-leg, which was defended by Shamrock with a sprawl, and Shamrock attempted to stand up back to his feet. Gracie then responded by pulling Shamrock to his guard and started to do small kicks into Shamrock's kidneys, but he got out from his guard and attempted to pull Gracie into a heel hook, as he had done with Patrick Smith similarly before. The Brazilian defended by wrapping his gi around Shamrock's arm, and when the latter sat back, it pulled Gracie on top of him. He then proceeded to take Shamrock's back and used his own gi to secure a rear naked choke. Shamrock later stated it was a gi choke, using the cloth around his neck. Shamrock tapped out to Gracie's choke, but the referee did not see the tap and ordered both fighters to continue the match. Shamrock then admitted defeat to the referee, saying it would not be fair, and Royce was declared the bout's victor, with both fighters exchanging a handshake after some taunting.

Gracie fought in the finals against karate Kyokushin practitioner and savate world champion Gerard Gordeau. Gracie managed to take his opponent to the ground and secure a rear choke, winning the bout. During the fight, Gordeau bit Gracie's ear, breaking one of the few rules of the event. Gracie retaliated by holding the choke after Gordeau had tapped out, with the Dutchman tapping in panic before they were separated by a referee. Royce was then declared the "Ultimate Fighting Champion" and was awarded $50,000 in prize money.

Rivalry with Ken Shamrock 
After Gracie defeated Ken Shamrock in the first UFC event, a rivalry developed between the fighters. Shamrock especially wanted a rematch as, according to him, Gracie had used the gi to favor his grappling while he had not been allowed to use wrestling shoes by the promoters, which he considered an unfair advantage to Gracie. Shamrock nonetheless conceded that he had underestimated his opponent.

A rematch between Royce Gracie and Ken Shamrock failed to materialize at the UFC 2, as Shamrock had broken his hand in training and at UFC 3 Gracie withdrew from the competition due to exhaustion (resulting in Shamrock withdrawing from the event too). To solve the problem of the tournament format's unpredictability, a "superfight" in which Gracie and Ken Shamrock would fight in a bout outside the main tournament was scheduled for the UFC 5.

UFC 2
Gracie returned to defend his title four months later at UFC 2, this tournament would have sixteen fighters and he would have to defeat four opponents in order to become the champion. Gracie began his defense of the title by submitting Japanese Karatedo Daido Juku and Kyokushin karateka Minoki Ichihara after a five-minute bout, his longest yet. Advancing into the quarterfinals, Royce Gracie fought Five Animals Kung Fu practitioner and future Pancrase veteran Jason DeLucia, whom he had already fought and defeated before in one of the "Gracie Challenges" in 1991. Gracie submitted DeLucia via armbar just over a minute into the bout. Gracie then submitted 250-lb Judo and Taekwondo black belt Remco Pardoel with a lapel choke, and arrived at the finals against kickboxer Patrick Smith, who had previously participated at UFC 1. Showing his superior grappling skills, Gracie easily took Smith to the ground and won the fight via submission to punches.

UFC 3
Royce Gracie entered UFC 3 now as twice-champion and as the favorite to win. The amount of fighters was scaled down back to eight like the first edition. Royce was matched up in the first round against Kimo Leopoldo, a representative of Taekwondo and former high school wrestler. Leopoldo utilized his wrestling background to dominate the grappling exchanges, denying several of Gracie's takedowns and even took his back. As both men began to tire, Gracie held down Leopoldo by grabbing onto his pony tail, eventually submitting him with an armbar at 4:40 of round one. However, he withdrew from his next fight with Gōjū-ryū karateka Harold Howard before it began due to exhaustion and dehydration. Royce entered into the ring and threw in the towel. This was the first event which Gracie did not win.

UFC 4
Gracie began the UFC 4 by submitting 51-year-old Karateka and Kung fu film actor Ron van Clief in the opening round with a rear-naked choke near the four-minute mark. In the semi-finals, he fought American Kenpo Karate specialist Keith Hackney, who was able to defend Gracie's takedowns for four minutes until he was submitted by an armbar.

Gracie's final tournament bout was against Dan Severn, a former Pan American freestyle wrestling gold medalist. Severn dominated the fight, securing takedowns and maintaining top control throwing ground and pound for nearly fifteen minutes. However Gracie eventually managed to secure a triangle choke for the submission victory at 15:49 of round one. The match extended beyond the pay-per-view time slot and viewers, who missed the end of the fight, demanded their money back.

UFC 5
Gracie and Shamrock returned for UFC 5, they were both set to headline the UFC's first "superfight", a special outside the main tournament in order to rematch Gracie and Shamrock, as they would have no prior damage from a previous fight. The winner would win a special belt and become the inaugural UFC Superfight Champion. Time limits were re-introduced into the sport in 1995 due pay-per-view limits after the UFC 4 debacle and the fighters were only told a few hours before the event, upsetting both competitors.

At the start of round one, Shamrock immediately scored a takedown with Gracie pulling guard. The majority of the contest consisted of Shamrock in top position defending Gracie's submission game, occasionally landing ground and pound. After nearly thirty minutes of control time for Shamrock, the contest was given overtime and restarted on the feet. At the beginning of the overtime, Shamrock connected with a punch that led to swelling on Gracie's eye, with Gracie immediately pulling guard. After another uneventful few minutes, the contest was declared a draw.

The draw sparked much debate and controversy as to who would have won the fight had judges determined the outcome, or had there been no time limits, as by the end of the fight Gracie's right eye was swollen shut. Had there been ringside judges, UFC matchmaker Art Davie believes that Shamrock would have been declared the winner. The fight was poorly received by critics and the live audience, due to the lack of action from both competitors.

After the fight, Gracie left the UFC along with his brother Rorion, who sold his shares of the event. According to Rorion, they left the organization due a conflict of interest because of the time limits introduced after UFC 4 and future plans to introduce judges,  and weight classes.

At UFC 45 in November 2003, at the ten-year anniversary of the UFC, Shamrock and Gracie became the first inductees into the UFC Hall of Fame. UFC President Dana White said;

Royce's challenge letters
Throughout his UFC days, Royce frequently challenged well-known fighters—though usually to no avail—to "fight to the finish, any place and any time." Many big-name sportspeople, including Mike Tyson (who was serving a prison term at the time) received a note several times in an open letter fashion, usually published by Black Belt Magazine in The Ultimate Fighter column.

PRIDE Fighting Championships

Attempts to sign Royce
Gracie was originally going to debut in PRIDE Fighting Championships in their 1998 PRIDE 2 event, where he would be pitted against fellow UFC champion Mark Kerr. The Gracie side demanded special rules without time limit or referee stoppage, which were accepted. However, Royce pulled out due to a back injury after the fight had been advertised.

The situation changed after PRIDE 8, when Royce's older brother Royler Gracie was defeated by Kazushi Sakuraba. Sakuraba dominated the match and won by technical submission. This was the first time in 50 years a Gracie had been defeated in a mixed martial arts fight and Sakuraba followed by a challenge to Rickson Gracie. In response, the Gracies argued that Royler's loss did not count as he had not conceded or tapped out, and the referee's stopping of the bout went against the special ruleset they had requested for the fight. Many pundits were also affirming that the Gracie pure-BJJ approach was not able to match a well-rounded cross-trainined fighter anymore. In response to that assertion, and in order to defeat Sakuraba in a rematch, the Gracies signed Royce up to PRIDE.

PRIDE Grand Prix and bout against Nobuhiko Takada 

Royce Gracie's first event in PRIDE was in the "PRIDE Grand Prix 2000", an openweight tournament that would be divided into two events: the Opening Round, which consisted of the Round of 16 and the Finals which would happen three months later and consisted of the Quarter-Finals, Semi-Finals and Finals. The bouts in the Opening Round had their rules modified to have only one round of fifteen minutes. In the first round, he fought Japanese professional wrestler Nobuhiko Takada. Takada was a very popular wrestler who had headlined Pride 1 and Pride 4 against Royce's brother Rickson. After a largely uneventful fight, Gracie was declared the winner by unanimous decision and advanced to the Grand Prix Quarter-Finals.

Bout with Sakuraba

Royce was then set to fight Kazushi Sakuraba in the Quarter-Finals at the PRIDE Grand Prix 2000 Finals. Sakuraba was a professional wrestler who derived his foundation in submissions from catch wrestling and shoot wrestling. He had defeated several opponents and become one of the first Japanese stars of PRIDE. As Royce entered the Grand Prix specially to fight Sakuraba, the Gracies demanded special rules for the fight: an unlimited number of 15-minute rounds, no judges, no referee stoppages, and wins could only come by knockout, submission or throwing in the towel. Sakuraba criticized the different ruleset, the Gracie's demands to fight under it and their demands for special treatment, but ended up agreeing to the challenge nonetheless.

The two battled for an hour and a half, after which Gracie began to fatigue, and could no longer stand due to a broken femur as a result of numerous leg kicks. The towel was thrown in and Sakuraba was declared the winner. Sakuraba went on to defeat other members of the Gracie family, including Renzo Gracie and Ryan Gracie, earning him the nickname "Gracie Hunter."

Bouts with Yoshida

Gracie returned to PRIDE in 2002 to fight Japanese gold-medalist judoka Hidehiko Yoshida in a special "Judo vs. Brazilian Jiu-Jitsu" special rules match, billed as a "rematch" of Masahiko Kimura vs. Hélio Gracie, which had happened 50 years earlier. The rules were that the fight would be contested in two 10-minute rounds and would be declared a draw if no result was achieved. Strikes to the head were disallowed, as it was any kind of strike if both opponents were on the ground. Lying on the mat or dropping down without touching the opponent would be banned as well. Both fighters would wear a keikogi as per their respective disciplines's preference. It happened at Pride Shockwave a co-production between PRIDE and K-1 kickboxing, intended to be a mega-event celebrating martial arts, with the event still having the largest live attendance in MMA history, drawing almost 91,000 fans (with some sources suggesting instead 71,000). Royce's father Hélio Gracie lit a ceremonial olympic torch along with MMA pioneer Antonio Inoki in the opening ceremony.

Royce started the fight pulling guard and attempting a heel hook and an armbar, with Hidehiko blocking them and coming back with a gi choke and an ankle lock attempt. Gracie pulled guard again, but Yoshida turned it into a daki age and sought the Kimura lock; then, when the Brazilian blocked the technique, Yoshida passed his guard and performed a mounted sode guruma jime. After a moment of inactivity, the referee Daisuke Noguchi stopped the match in the belief Royce was unconscious and gave victory to Yoshida.

Gracie immediately protested and footage of the fight was reviewed, which showed that Gracie's visible arm during the execution of the choke was limp and motionless. Gracie began to argue with Noguchi, the squabble soon resulted in him attacking the referee and it escalated into a full a brawl between the corners of the two fighters. Later backstage, the Gracies demanded it be turned into a no contest, and an immediate rematch be booked with different rules. If not, the Gracie family would never fight for PRIDE FC again. PRIDE, wanting to keep the Gracie family with them, accepted their demands.

Afterward, Gracie started fighting without a gi so that his opponents could not stall by holding onto it. The grudge match between Yoshida and Gracie took place at PRIDE's Shockwave 2003 event on December 31, 2003. Gracie dominated Yoshida but, as the match had no judge per Gracie's request, the bout was declared a draw after two 10-minute rounds.

Fighting and Entertainment Group
In September 2004 Pride had a disagreement with Gracie about his participation in the 2005 Pride Middleweight Grand Prix. Gracie had issues with the proposed opponents and rules (Grand Prix fights must have a winner and cannot end in a draw). He jumped to Fighting and Entertainment Group's K-1 organization. Pride sued Gracie for breaching his contract with them. The case was settled in December 2005, with Gracie issuing a public apology, blaming his actions on a misinterpretation of the contract by his manager.

In K-1, Royce Gracie competed on K-1's Dynamite!! series, which featured both kickboxing and MMA matches on their cards. On December 31, 2004, Gracie entered the K-1 scene at the K-1 PREMIUM 2004 Dynamite!! event inside the Osaka Dome, facing off against former sumo wrestler and MMA newcomer Akebono Tarō aka. Chad Rowan under special MMA rules (Two 10-minute rounds; the match would end as a draw if there was no winner after the two rounds). Gracie made quick work of his heavy opponent, forcing Akebono to submit to a shoulder lock at 2:13 of the first round.

Exactly one year later, on the K-1 PREMIUM 2005 Dynamite!! card of December 31, 2005, Gracie fought Japan's Hideo Tokoro, a 143-pound fighter, in a fight ending in a draw after 20 minutes. Gracie's original opponent was scheduled to be the tall Korean fighter Choi Hong-man, another MMA newcomer.

Return to UFC
On January 16, 2006, UFC President Dana White announced that Royce Gracie would return to the UFC to fight UFC welterweight champion Matt Hughes on May 27, 2006, at UFC 60. This was a non-title bout at a catchweight of 175 lb. under UFC/California State Athletic Commission rules. To prepare Gracie cross-trained in Muay Thai and was frequently shown in publicity materials from Fairtex.

In round one, Hughes secured a straight armbar that hyper-extended Royce's arm, however Royce refused to tap. Hughes eventually won the fight by TKO at 4:39 of the first round. 
Royce said later after the fight with Hughes that he wanted a rematch and that he was not surprised by Hughes's performance: "No, we knew what he was planning to do. We worked out his gameplan before the fight, and he did exactly what we expected. I over-trained for the fight. That was all. I started training too much, too hard, for too long. He did exactly what we expected."

Rematch with Sakuraba

On May 8, 2007, EliteXC announced that Gracie's opponent for the June 2 K-1 Dynamite!! USA event in Los Angeles would be Japanese fighter Kazushi Sakuraba.

Gracie defeated Sakuraba by a unanimous decision. However, a post-fight drug screen revealed that Royce had traces of Nandrolone in his system. "Use of steroids is simply cheating," said Armando Garcia, California State Athletic Commission executive director. "It won't be tolerated in this state."

Steroids scandal
On June 14, 2007, the California State Athletic Commission declared that Gracie had tested positive for Nandrolone, an anabolic steroid, after his fight with Sakuraba. According to the California State Athletic Commission, the average person could produce about 2 ng/ml of Nandrolone, while an athlete following "rigorous physical exercise" could have a level of around 6 ng/ml. Both "A" and "B" test samples provided by Gracie "had a level of over 50 ng/ml and we were informed that the level itself was so elevated that it would not register on the laboratory's calibrator," said the CSAC. Gracie was fined $2,500 (the maximum penalty the commission can impose) and suspended for the remainder of his license, which ended on May 30, 2008. Gracie paid the fine.

Royce Gracie decided to dispute the allegations during an online video interview in May 2009, saying that his weight in the first UFC event was 178 lb and claiming his weight during his Sakuraba fight was 180 lb, thus only gaining 2 pounds. This was widely disputed by experts. According to ESPN, "In the former contest, he weighed in at 175 pounds; for Sakuraba, he was 188. One may not need to be nutritionist to observe that a muscle gain of 13 pounds in one year at the age of 40 is a strikingly accomplished feat. Athletes nearing the half-century mark are often happy to maintain functional mass, let alone pack it on".

Retirement
On March 11, 2011, Royce Gracie's profile was added back to ufc.com active fighters list as a middleweight. His manager stated that they were actively negotiating with the UFC for a return to the Octagon and said it was just a matter of "getting it nailed down" and that there was plenty of time for it.
On November 15, 2013, at UFC 167 on the 20th Anniversary of the UFC, Royce Gracie confirmed to MMA journalist Ariel Helwani that he had retired from competing in mixed martial arts.

Return with Bellator MMA
At Bellator 145, it was announced that Gracie would return from retirement to face rival Ken Shamrock in a trilogy fight, taking place on February 19, 2016, at Bellator 149. Gracie won the fight via TKO in round one. The win was not without controversy, however, as replays showed that Gracie landed a knee strike that grazed the groin of Shamrock prior to the finish. Shamrock protested the stoppage, however the bout was officially ruled a victory for Gracie. It was later announced that Shamrock had failed his pre-fight drug test for banned substances.

Post-fight career 

Gracie has been since retired from MMA competition and has been focusing in teaching Jiu-jitsu. He mostly travels around the world going to schools, teaching in seminars and doing interviews in magazines, websites and talk shows. He has opened his own association of gyms known as "Royce Gracie Jiu-Jitsu Network", with affiliate schools in 34 locations in the United States, and many throughout the world in Brazil, Canada, Ecuador, Guatemala, Kuwait, United Arab Emirates, and the United Kingdom.

Career accomplishments

Ultimate Fighting Championship
UFC Hall of Fame (Inaugural inductee, part of the pioneer wing, class of 2003)
UFC 1 Tournament Championship
UFC 2 Tournament Championship
UFC 4 Tournament Championship
UFC Viewer's Choice Award
First tournament champion in UFC history
Longest fight in UFC history (36 minutes) - vs Ken Shamrock at (UFC 5)
Most tournament wins in UFC history (Eleven)
Most tournaments won in UFC history (Three)
Most fights in a single night in UFC history (Four) - tied with (Patrick Smith)
Highest submissions-per-win percentage in UFC history (10 submissions / 11 wins - 90.91%)

Pride Fighting Championships
Longest fight in Pride history (90 minutes) - vs Kazushi Sakuraba at (Pride Grand Prix 2000 Finals)

Fight Matrix
Fighter of the Year (1993)

Black Belt Magazine
Competitor of the Year (1994)

Wrestling Observer Newsletter
Fight of the Year (2000) vs. Kazushi Sakuraba on May 1

World MMA Awards
2013 Lifetime Achievement

Personal life
Gracie filed for divorce in 2016. He and his former wife Marianne have three sons and a daughter. His son Kheydon Gracie enlisted in the US Army.

Despite being a 7th degree coral belt, Gracie wears a dark blue belt when training in Brazilian jiu-jitsu paying homage to his father, Hélio Gracie, who primarily wore a dark blue belt despite having the highest possible rank, red belt.  Hélio Gracie died in 2009, and  Royce  said he does not want to be promoted by anybody else.

He is a supporter of Donald Trump and Jair Bolsonaro.

Gracie won the 2022 Sig Sauer Hunter Games as a member of Team Warrior.

Instructor lineage

Brazilian Jiu-Jitsu 
Kano Jigoro → Tomita Tsunejiro → Mitsuyo Maeda  → Carlos Gracie  → Hélio Gracie  → Royce Gracie

Controversies
Gracie has engaged in multiple disputes with other martial artists including his nephews Rener Gracie, Ryron Gracie, and Eddie Bravo.

Legal troubles
On April 1, 2015, the IRS sent Royce Gracie and his wife a Notice of Deficiency claiming they owe $657,114 in back taxes and $492,835.25 in penalties for Civil Fraud, based on IRC 6663(a).

Mixed martial arts record

|- 
| Win
| align=center| 
| Ken Shamrock
| TKO (knee and punches)
| Bellator 149
| 
| align=center| 1
| align=center| 2:22
| Houston, Texas, United States
|  
|-
| Win
| align=center| 14–2–3
| Kazushi Sakuraba
| Decision (unanimous)
| Dynamite!! USA
| 
| align=center| 3
| align=center| 5:00
| Los Angeles, California, United States
|  
|-
| Loss
| align=center| 13–2–3
| Matt Hughes
| TKO (punches)
| UFC 60
| 
| align=center| 1
| align=center| 4:39
| Los Angeles, California, United States
| 
|-
| Draw
| align=center| 13–1–3
| Hideo Tokoro
| Draw
| K-1 PREMIUM 2005 Dynamite!!
| 
| align=center| 2
| align=center| 10:00
| Osaka, Osaka, Japan
|  
|-
| Win
| align=center| 13–1–2
| Akebono Taro
| Submission (omoplata)
| K-1 PREMIUM 2004 Dynamite!!
| 
| align=center| 1
| align=center| 2:13
| Osaka, Osaka, Japan
| 
|-
| Draw
| align=center| 12–1–2
| Hidehiko Yoshida
| Draw (time limit)
| Pride Shockwave 2003
| 
| align=center| 2
| align=center| 10:00
| Saitama, Saitama, Japan
|  
|-
| Loss
| align=center| 12–1–1
| Kazushi Sakuraba
| TKO (corner stoppage)
| Pride Grand Prix 2000 Finals
| 
| align=center| 6
| align=center| 15:00
| Tokyo, Japan
|  
|-
| Win
| align=center| 12–0–1
| Nobuhiko Takada
| Decision (unanimous)
| Pride Grand Prix 2000 Opening Round
| 
| align=center| 1
| align=center| 15:00
| Tokyo, Japan
| 
|-
| Draw
| align=center| 11–0–1
| Ken Shamrock
| Draw (time limit)
| UFC 5
| 
| align=center| 1
| align=center| 36:00
| Charlotte, North Carolina, United States
| 
|-
| Win
| align=center| 11–0
| Dan Severn
| Submission (triangle choke)
| rowspan=3| UFC 4
| rowspan=3| 
| align=center| 1
| align=center| 15:49
| rowspan=3| Tulsa, Oklahoma, United States
|  
|-
| Win
| align=center| 10–0
| Keith Hackney
| Submission (armbar)
| align=center| 1
| align=center| 5:32
| 
|-
| Win
| align=center| 9–0
| Ron van Clief
| Submission (rear-naked choke)
| align=center| 1
| align=center| 3:59
| 
|-
| Win
| align=center| 8–0
| Kimo Leopoldo
| Submission (armbar)
| UFC 3
| 
| align=center| 1
| align=center| 4:40
| Charlotte, North Carolina, United States
| 
|-
| Win
| align=center| 7–0
| Patrick Smith
| TKO (submission to punches)
| rowspan=4| UFC 2
| rowspan=4| 
| align=center| 1
| align=center| 1:17
| rowspan=4| Denver, Colorado, United States
| 
|-
| Win
| align=center| 6–0
| Remco Pardoel
| Submission (lapel choke)
| align=center| 1
| align=center| 1:31
| 
|-
| Win
| align=center| 5–0
| Jason DeLucia
| Submission (armbar)
| align=center| 1
| align=center| 1:07
| 
|-
| Win
| align=center| 4–0
| Minoki Ichihara
| Submission (lapel choke)
| align=center| 1
| align=center| 5:08
| 
|-
| Win
| align=center| 3–0
| Gerard Gordeau
| Submission (rear-naked choke)
| rowspan=3| UFC 1
| rowspan=3| 
| align=center| 1
| align=center| 1:44
| rowspan=3| Denver, Colorado, United States
| 
|-
| Win
| align=center| 2–0
| Ken Shamrock
| Submission (rear-naked choke)
| align=center| 1
| align=center| 0:57
| 
|-
| Win
| align=center| 1–0
| Art Jimmerson
| Submission (smother choke)
| align=center| 1
| align=center| 2:18
|

See also
Gracie family
Rodrigo Gracie
List of doping cases in sport
List of Brazilian Jiu-Jitsu practitioners

References

External links

1966 births
Living people
Brazilian male mixed martial artists
Brazilian people of Scottish descent
Brazilian emigrants to the United States
Brazilian Muay Thai practitioners
Sportspeople from Rio de Janeiro (city)
Sportspeople from Torrance, California
Welterweight mixed martial artists
Brazilian sportspeople in doping cases
Doping cases in mixed martial arts
Middleweight mixed martial artists
Light heavyweight mixed martial artists
People awarded a coral belt in Brazilian jiu-jitsu
Royce
Ultimate Fighting Championship male fighters
Mixed martial artists utilizing Muay Thai
Mixed martial artists utilizing Brazilian jiu-jitsu
Brazilian jiu-jitsu practitioners who have competed in MMA (men)